USS PGM-9 was a  in service with the United States Navy during World War II.

Ship history
Laid down by Consolidated Ship Building Corp. on 19 December 1943, as PC-1548, she was launched on 13 February 1944. On 1 July 1944, she was commissioned into naval service. She underwent a conversion to a Motor Gunboat on 4 February 1944, and was renamed PGM-9, re-entering service shortly thereafter.

Ships fate
On 9 October 1945, at Buckner Bay, Okinawa, in Typhoon Louise PGM-9 ran aground on Hira Sone Reef at 15:11.

Effectively put out of commission due to damage from running aground, she remained grounded on the reef and was decommissioned on 10 December 1945. PGM-9 was demolished 17 days later on 27 December 1945, and finally struck from the Naval Register on 3 January 1946.

External links
NavSource-USS PGM-09
Patrol Craft Association-PGM's
U-Boat.net, USS PC-1548

References

 

Ships of the United States Navy
1943 ships
Gunboats of the United States Navy
World War II gunboats of the United States
PGM-9-class motor gunboats